Knud Ovessøn Gjedde (c. 1635–c. 1708) was a Danish-Norwegian government official, the son of Ove Gjedde.  He served as the first County Governor of Nordland county from 1669 until 1686.  He was also temporarily served as the acting county governor of Finnmark county from 1680 to 1681.

After serving in Norway as a county governor, he moved to Denmark and was the county governor in Silkeborg amt and Mariager amt from 1686 until his death in 1708.

References

1635 births
1708 deaths
County governors of Norway